The following is a list of seasons completed by the Charlotte 49ers football team.

The school that would eventually evolve into the University of North Carolina at Charlotte, the Charlotte Center for the University of North Carolina, began playing football in its first three years of existence, but folded the program in 1949. The football program was restarted in 2013.  The 49ers are a member of the FBS's Conference USA since 2015 when they moved up a subdivision after two years as a Division I FCS independent. The team plays their home games in 15,314-seat Jerry Richardson Stadium.

Seasons

References

Charlotte
Charlotte 49ers football seasons